{{DISPLAYTITLE:C26H40O3}}
The molecular formula C26H40O3 may refer to:

 Mesabolone, or 1-testosterone 17β-methoxycyclopentyl ether
 Prasterone enanthate
 Testosterone enanthate
 Trestolone enanthate